Korytnica may refer to:

Korytnica, Łódź Voivodeship (central Poland)
Korytnica, Jędrzejów County in Świętokrzyskie Voivodeship (south-central Poland)
Korytnica, Staszów County in Świętokrzyskie Voivodeship (south-central Poland)
Korytnica, Garwolin County in Masovian Voivodeship (east-central Poland)
Korytnica, Węgrów County in Masovian Voivodeship (east-central Poland)
Korytnica, Greater Poland Voivodeship (west-central Poland)

See also
 (Slovakia)